Xurxo Borrazás Fariña, born in Carballo, Spain, on 6 August 1963, is a Spanish writer in Galician language and translator from English to Galician.

Biography 

He earned a degree in English philology from the Universidade de Santiago de Compostela. At this time, he began to write poetry, and then continued writing narrative fiction. He has translated Tropic of Cancer by Henry Miller (for Galaxia) and The Sound and the Fury by William Faulker into Galician. His fiction has been defined as experimental and transgressive. Some of his novels have been translated into Spanish, English, Russian and Portuguese. Several stories have appeared in English in the anthology From the Beginning of the Sea published in Oxford by Foreign Demand. He has lectured at Spanish and British universities and writes articles on the fields of culture and politics for Galician press.

Works

Novels 

 Cabeza de chorlito (1991)
 Vicious (Criminal) (1994), English translation 2015
 Eu é (1996)
 O desintegrista (1999)
 Na maleta (2000)
 Pensamentos Impuros (2002)
 Ser ou non (2004)
 Costa norte/ZFK (2008)
 Covalladas. Prosa vertical (2010)

Short stories 

Collections:
 Contos malvados (1998), collection of 13 short stories
 Brevedume (2019), collection of aphorisms

Non-fiction 

 Arte e parte (2007), essays

Awards

 1994 Premio de la Crítica de narrativa gallega, for Vicious
 1995 Premio San Clemente, for Vicious
 2001 Premio Antón Losada Diéguez in category Creación literaria, for Na maleta
 2008 Premio de la Crítica de Galicia in category Ensayo y Pensamiento, for Arte e parte

References

External links
Author profile at Editorial Galaxia
Text of "Blackbirds"
Fragment in English from "Ser ou non"
"Paper on Minority Language Literature"
La aldea muerta, novel, in Google books
yuard. A story in Litro magazine

1963 births
Living people
People from Bergantiños
Spanish male writers
Writers from Galicia (Spain)
Galician translators
Translators from English
Translators to Galician
Postmodern writers
Galician-language writers